Giacomo Maccari (Rome, c. 1700 – Venice, after 1744) was an Italian opera composer.

Works 
 Adaloaldo furioso (melodramma, libretto di Antonio Maria Lucchini, carnevale 1727, Venezia)
 La pupilla (intermezzo, libretto di Carlo Goldoni, 1734, Venezia)
 Il conte Copano (intermezzo, libretto di Antonio Gori e Giuseppe Imer, 1734, Venezia)
 Ottaviano trionfante di Marc'Antonio (dramma comico, libretto di P. Miti, carnevale 1735, Venezia)
 La fondazione di Venezia (divertimento per musica con prologo e 11 scene, libretto di Carlo Goldoni, autunno 1736, Venezia)
 Lucrezia Romana in Costantinopoli (dramma comico in tre atti, libretto di Carlo Goldoni, carnevale 1743, Venezia)
 La contessina (dramma per musica in tre atti, libretto di Carlo Goldoni, 26 dicembre 1742, Teatro San Samuele di Venezia)
 Cantata per contralto e basso continuo

References

Italian Baroque composers
Italian opera composers
Male opera composers
1700s births
18th-century deaths